Tovah Khoshkeh or Toveh Khoshkeh may refer to:

Toveh Khoshkeh, Kermanshah
Tovah Khoshkeh, Salas-e Babajani, Kermanshah Province
Tovah Khoshkeh, Lorestan